The AFC Champions League (abbreviated as ACL) is an annual continental club football competition organised by the Asian Football Confederation, and contested by Asia's top-division football clubs. It is the most prestigious club competition in Asian football, played by the national league champions (and, for some nations, one or more runners-up) of their national associations.

Introduced in 1967 as the Asian Champion Club Tournament, the competition rebranded and took on its current name in 2002 as a result of the merger between the Asian Club Championship, the Asian Cup Winners' Cup and the Asian Super Cup.

A total of 40 clubs compete in the round-robin group stage of the competition. Clubs from Asia's strongest national leagues receive automatic berths, with clubs from lower-ranked nations eligible to qualify via the qualifying playoffs, and they are also eligible to participate in the AFC Cup. The winner of the AFC Champions League qualifies for the FIFA Club World Cup.

The most successful club in the competition is Al-Hilal with a total of four titles. They are also the reigning champions after winning their fourth title in 2021.

History

1967–1972: Asian Champion Club Tournament
The competition started as the Asian Champion Club Tournament, a tournament for the champions of AFC nations, and had a variety of different formats, with the inaugural tournament staged as a straight knock-out format and the following three editions consisting of a group stage.

While Israeli clubs dominated the first four editions of the competition, this was partly due to the refusal of Arab clubs to play them:
 In 1970, Lebanese club Homenetmen refused to play Hapoel Tel Aviv in the semi-final, which was scratched with Hapoel advancing to the final.
 In 1971, Aliyat Al-Shorta of Iraq refused to play Maccabi Tel Aviv on three occasions: in the preliminary round (which was redrawn), in the group stage, and in the final, which was scratched with Maccabi being awarded the championship. During the award ceremony for Maccabi, Aliyat Al-Shorta players waved the Palestinian flag around the field, while the Iraqi media considered Aliyat Al-Shorta as the tournament's winners, with the team holding an open top bus parade in Baghdad. 

After the 1972 edition had to be cancelled by the AFC for various reasons, including two Arab clubs being excluded for refusing to commit to playing against Israeli club Maccabi Netanya, the AFC suspended the competition for 14 years, while Israel would be expelled from the AFC in 1974.

1985–2002: Return as the Asian Club Championship
Asia's premier club tournament made its return in 1985 as the Asian Club Championship. 

In 1990, the Asian Football Confederation introduced the Asian Cup Winners' Cup, a tournament for the cup winners of each AFC nation, while the 1995 season saw the introduction of the Asian Super Cup, with the winners of the Asian Club Championship and Asian Cup Winners' Cup playing against each other.

2002–present: AFC Champions League

The 2002–03 season saw the Asian Club Championship, Asian Cup Winners' Cup and Asian Super Cup combine to become the AFC Champions League. League champions and cup winners would qualify for the qualifying playoffs with the best eight clubs from East Asia and the eight best clubs from West Asia progressing to the group stage. The first winners under the AFC Champions League name were Al-Ain, defeating BEC Tero Sasana 2–1 on aggregate. In 2004, 29 clubs from fourteen countries participated and the tournament schedule was changed to March–November. 

In the group stage, the 28 clubs were divided into seven groups of four on a regional basis, separating East Asian and West Asian clubs to reduce travel costs, and the groups were played on a home and away basis. The seven group winners along with the defending champions qualified to the quarter-finals. The quarter-finals, semi-finals, and finals were played as a two-legged format, with away goals, extra time, and penalties used as tie-breakers.

Expansion
The 2005 season saw Syrian clubs join the competition, thus increasing the number of participating countries to 15, and two years later, following their transfer into the AFC in 2006, Australian clubs were also included in the tournament. However, many blamed the low prize money at that time and expensive travel cost as some of the reasons. The Champions League was expanded to 32 clubs in 2009 with direct entry to the top ten Asian leagues. Each country received up to 4 slots, though no more than one-third of the number of teams in that country's top division, rounded downwards, depending on the strength of their league, professional league structure, marketability, financial status, as well as other criteria set by the AFC Pro-League Committee. The assessment criteria and ranking for participating associations are revised by AFC every two years.

The old format saw the eight group winners and eight runners-up qualify to the Round of 16, in which group winners played host to the runners-up in two-legged series, matched regionally, with away goals, extra time, and penalties used as tie-breakers. The regional restriction continues all the way until the final, although clubs from the same country couldn't face each other in the quarterfinals unless that country has three or more representatives in the quarterfinals. Since 2013, the final has also been held as a two-legged series, on a home and away basis.

In 2021, the group stage was expanded from 32 to 40 teams, with both the West and East Regions having five groups of four teams. The slot allocation for the top six member associations in each region remained unchanged. The 10 group winners and top 3 runners-up per region are now seeded based on a combination table for the Round of 16, with the games still matched regionally until the Final.

On 25 February 2022, it was announced that the AFC Champions League will go back to an inter-year (autumn to spring) schedule starting with the 2023–24 season. This will be the first time Asia's premier club competition will be played in between years since 2002–03. In addition, the existing "3+1" rule for foreign players during matches (3 foreign players and 1 Asian foreigner) will be expanded to be "5+1" (5 foreign players and 1 Asian foreigner).

Reform
On 23 December 2022, it was announced that the AFC competition structure would change from the established formats. Under the new plans, the top club competition of Asian football will only consist of 24 teams, divided into East and West regions, with each team playing eight other teams from their region (four teams at home and four teams away). The top eight teams per region will advance to the knockout stage, where only the round of 16 will be played over two legs, and from the quarter-finals onward the matches will be held at a neutral venue. It is currently unknown when this format will take effect or whether it will have the AFC Champions League moniker.

Women's rights in Iranian football
By 2021, the various problems with the Iranian sides were attracting media attention; international Arabic and English-language media reported the violation of women's rights in the stadiums of Iranian sides.

On top of that, Iranian women were banned from football stadiums for about 40 years, by the Iranian government. In 2019, Iranian women were first allowed to watch football at stadiums, but not during ACL games. Before that, FIFA had pressured Iran to let women into the stadiums; Iran relented, but capped the number of women to watch the 2018 final. In 2021, the AFC investigated the matter, in the hope of allowing unrestricted attendance whenever Iranian clubs are involved.

Format

Qualification

As of the 2021 edition of the tournament, the AFC Champions League has commenced with a double round-robin group stage of 40 teams, which is preceded by qualifying matches for teams that do not receive direct entry to the competition proper. Teams are also split into east and west zones to progress separately in the tournament.

The number of teams that each association enters into the AFC Champions League is determined annually through criteria as set by the AFC Competitions Committee. The criteria, which is a modified version of the UEFA coefficient, measures such thing as marketability and stadia to determine the specific number of berths that an association receives. The higher an association's ranking as determined by the criteria, the more teams represent the association in the Champions League, and the fewer qualification rounds the association's teams must compete in.

Tournament
The tournament proper begins with a group stage of 40 teams, divided into ten groups. Seeding is used whilst making the draw for this stage, with teams from the same country not being drawn into groups together. The group stage is divided into two zones; the first zone is the five East Asian groups and the other zone is the five West Asian groups. Each team meets the others in its group home and away in a round-robin format. The winning team and the runners-up from each group then progress to the next round.

For this stage, the winning team from one group plays against the runners-up from another group from their zone of the group stage. The tournament uses the away goals rule: if the aggregate score of the two games is tied after 180 minutes, then the team who scored more goals at their opponent's stadium advances. If still tied the clubs play extra time, where the away goals rule is no longer applied. If still tied after extra time, the tie shall be decided by a penalty shootout. East and West zones continue to be kept part until the final.

The group stage and Round of 16 matches are played through the first half of the year (February–May), whilst the knock-out stage thereafter is played during the second half of the year (August–November). The knock-out ties are played in a two-legged format, including the final.

Allocation
Teams from only 19 AFC countries have reached the group stage of the AFC Champions League. The allocation of teams by member countries is listed below; asterisks represent occasions where at least one team was eliminated in qualification prior to the group stage. 32 AFC countries have had teams participate in qualification, and countries that have never had teams reach the group stage are not shown.

Prize money

The prize money for the 2021 AFC Champions League:

Marketing

Sponsorship
Like the FIFA World Cup, the AFC Champions League is sponsored by a group of multinational corporations, in contrast to the single main sponsor typically found in national top-flight leagues.

The tournament's current main sponsors are:

 Neom
 Konami
Molten

Video game
The current license holder for the AFC Champions League video game is Konami with the Pro Evolution Soccer series. The license also includes the competing teams.

Records and statistics

Overall performances by club

Overall performances by nation

Performances by region 

Note: Israeli clubs, winners of the 1967, 1969 and 1971 editions, are not included.

Awards

Most Valuable Player

Top scorers

Fair Play Award winners

See also 

AFC Cup
AFC Women's Club Championship
Asian Cup Winners' Cup
Asian Super Cup
Continental football championships
List of association football competitions

References

External links

 
1
Multi-national professional sports leagues